Joseph Oliver Gomes (December 12, 1908 – February 9, 1986) was an American Negro league outfielder in the 1930s.

A native of East Providence, Rhode Island of Cape Verdean descent, Gomes attended East Providence High School, where he was an all-state baseball player, leading the school to the state championship in 1928. He went on to attend Providence College, where he played baseball and football, but dropped out after a racist incident kept him off the field in a game against William and Mary. He went on to play in the Negro leagues, including time with the Bacharach Giants in 1932. Gomes died in his hometown of East Providence in 1986 at age 77.

References

External links
Baseball statistics and player information from Seamheads

1908 births
1986 deaths
Bacharach Giants players
20th-century African-American sportspeople
American people of Cape Verdean descent